A water fight is a type of mock combat using various water-dispensing devices to soak opponents. Everything from buckets to balloons to water guns and even cupped hands cradling water can be applied in a water fight. There are many different levels of game play used by those engaging in water fights, from quick, casual fights to long, objective-oriented-style water warfare campaigns, and tournament-style games. In most but not all cases, the common objective is to soak (spray with water) one's opponents while trying to remain dry. Water fights are most common in hot summer weather in order to cool off.

History
It is unknown precisely when humans first began splashing their friends with water. Water play is exhibited by other animals such as monkeys or even elephants opting to spray themselves and others in an attempt to cool off during hotter months.

Splashing others with water has likely been around since humans first discovered that a cupped-hand can be used to cradle water within. As mankind learned to use various natural objects, then tools, the ability to carry and pour/dispense water upon others became more possible. One still used ploy is to simply fill a wide-mouthed object (i.e. a bucket or pot) with water such that one can heave a wave of water towards another using one's arms. Though accuracy and range of this type of water attack is minimal, at close range, it is quite possible to significantly soak another.  This form of basic water combat is still employed today, particularly in Thailand during the Songkran festival.

There is little doubt humans have been splashing each other with water for a long time, particularly during hot days, as it seems to be a virtually instinctive act. Small infants and little children all enjoy splashing about in shallow wading pools or in the bathtub. Adolescents and adults often play pranks involving carefully positioned buckets of water atop doors or water balloons. However, these acts do not quite fall into the realm of the modern water fight definition, but do explain aspects of its origin.

Modern water fights are derived in many respects from actual military warfare.  However, unlike actual combat, water fights are meant to either cool down during a hot day or to safely simulate some aspects of combat without the danger of inflicting serious injuries.

The primary objective, as noted earlier, is most typically to soak an opponent or opposing team without getting soaked, oneself.  In less organized or casual cases, often the main objective is to cool down during a hot, summer day.  There are still aspects of competitiveness present even in the most disorganized 'Soak-Fest'.

Unlike other mock competitive warfare games like Laser Tag or Paintball, determining whether a water attack is successful is still the topic of some debate, particularly for attempts at creating an organized game as opposed to a simple free-for-all (See Game Types below).

Wet Monday

Water fights are traditionally part of Easter Monday celebration (often referred to as 'Wet Monday' in some Roman Catholic countries, most notably Poland (known as 'Śmigus-Dyngus' or 'Lany poniedziałek', Slovakia ('Šibačka/Polievačka') and Czech Republic ('velikonoční pondělí' or 'pomlázka'). Traditionally, early in the morning boys awake girls by pouring a bucket of water on their head, however most recently it has changed to an all-out "water war" between the girls (who were traditionally the only accepted target, but nowadays attack the boys as fiercely as the boys used to attack them) and the boys (usually children in pre-school or early school age). It is also not uncommon for randomly selected pedestrians to be soaked with water by the children. Most common "weapons" are water guns, water balloons and buckets full of water.

Water Wars
There are a number of different methods used by various groups as means to judge which side has won or lost.

Methods of scoring
There are a variety of methods used to score water fight games.  Common methods are noted below:

Relative wetness
This is a rather subjective means usually done by eye.  Water fight participants simply do rough approximations regarding the amount of their clothing has been soaked through versus how much dry area remains.  In the event all participants appear to be fully covered with water, sometimes participants opt to wring their clothing as further means to show how wet or dry they are.  Winners are often declared upon consensus by the group;

More precise methods of determining the amount of relative wetness are also available. This usually amounts to a measurement of the size of a single or multiple spots of water on an individual's clothing or equipment as predetermined before a battle. This method of scoring, while obviously malleable, is most often noted in its most popular form, the "fist sized splash" rule. In this way, a participant who has a "fist sized" splash of water on his/her clothing is "out" for a period of time specified earlier in the game. Variants on this method include using this as a "kill" which dictates a "respawn" either instantaneously or after a set period of time.

Balloon-hit
This method of judging a hit relies on the agreement and honesty between players as to what constitutes a direct vs. glancing water stream hit.  Some groups employ the rule that a 'fist-sized' area should be dampened on an opponent's clothing to be counted as a hit while others are more liberal, allowing almost any level of water contact (apart from simply mist) as counting as a hit.  Depending on the type of game being played, a hit would count either as a point or may result in a player being temporarily eliminated from gameplay. Other methods that have historically been counted as "hits" include "suiciding" (the act of running up to an opponent, and directly hitting them with the balloon still in your hand) also considered valid is "medieval oiling" the act of purposely breaking a balloon in your hands, directly over the opponent, thus wetting them from above. The rule of thumb to the validity of a "hit" involves what is deliberate and what is not deliberate. For example, if a balloon accidentally popped in a players hand and led to an opponent getting wet, it would not count as this is not deliberate. However, if a player purposely breaks a balloon in their hand to wet an opponent in a shotgun like fashion, it is generally counted.

Tag-based system
This method of scoring relies on some form of tag (either water-soluble or colour-changing when wet) to determine whether a hit or elimination is successful.  This is a more objective means of determining points or soaks compared to the methods listed above.  However, many argue that use of a tag is not necessarily accurate as tags tend to be small, only on one or two areas on a player's body, and can be much more easily covered/protected unfairly during a water fight, making it virtually impossible to score.

Water-collection device system
Some would ultimately prefer a device that could record or report the amount of water actually received by a player during a water fight.  However, the problem is that this type of device is hard to find and few are willing to wear them.  Presently, there is only one known company distributing such a device. Soaking level as recorded by such a device would arguably be the most objective and suitable method of scoring for a water war fight, but as this type of additional piece of equipment is hard to find, costs more (than simply estimating wetness), and is not particularly accepted by most water warriors, this means of scoring remains used by relatively few.

Dissolving Necklace
Another method of recording hits is to place a necklace (with a water-soluble pill or medicine on it) around the players' necks. When that person's necklace has fully dissolved, they are 'dead'. This scoring system is not used very often, and it could potentially be dangerous.

Popular game types
There are many popular game types for team-based and non-team-based games.  Common ones are summarized below:

Free-for-All/Soakfest
The most common, unorganized water fight; everyone fends for themselves and there are no particular rules apart from no intentional physical contact between players. In general, players are allowed as many refills as available and gameplay continues for as long as players are willing. There are no clear winners in a soakfest, though group consensus may declare an individual or group of players 'leaders' based on general ability to deliver more water onto others as opposed to receiving it themselves.

One-hit kills
This is one of the most basic forms of organized water fights.  A single water stream hit counts as an elimination from the game.  Games are played until there is only one person or one team remaining on the playing field.  However, unlike paintball, there are some debates regarding how best to determine whether a hit has occurred (See: Methods of Scoring above). One hit kills games are common during WaterWar.net's community wars, hosted semi-annually on the US east coast. One hit kills games were popularized by the "Vermin" and "Dominator" water wars, held semi-annually from the late 1999 through 2006.

One-hit Scores
Variation on OHK, but instead of player elimination, a point is awarded for a soak, but the soaked player continues to play shortly after.

Capture the flag
This is where you try to stay dry while soaking your opponents with water. The objective is to stay dry and get into enemy territory and to find the enemy flag. The first team to bring the enemy's flag back to their own territory wins.

Soaker tag
This game works like the game of tag, but using soakers and stream hits to determine who is 'It'.

Water dispensing devices

Water guns
The original water guns were made of metal and fashioned after actual firearms.  These early pistols did not dispense much water, but would likely be used like an early form of pepper spray, being filled with dangerous chemicals.  Modern water weapons are much more capable of delivering larger volumes of water over greater distances.

Hoses and sprinklers
Common water dispensing devices, but are considered unfair or for refilling use only in most organized games due to the 'unlimited' nature of their water supply.

Water balloons
Small rubber balloons similar to party balloons, though usually much smaller, that can be used to dispense relatively large amounts of water to a target.  Coming in a wide range of varieties, including multicolored and grenade color, water balloons are filled with water, tied and dispensed to a target (usually by hand).  When a balloon reaches a target, the balloon usually breaks, resulting in the water covering the target.  Water balloons are useful in several ways that soakers cannot be used.  First, they have a wide blast radius, so if multiple targets are fairly close together, all or most can be soaked with only a single balloon.  Also, this allows them for use when a target is behind a barrier, because a balloon does not have to directly hit a target to soak them, like a stream of water from a soaker.  Secondly, balloons can dispense a larger amount of water to a target faster than most common soakers, and a user doesn't need a bulky, hard plastic soaker to soak a target.  Disadvantages of water balloons are that less water can be carried by one person without a bag, and soakage range is dependent on the thrower's arm (except for launchers).  Also, water balloons take longer to fill up and tie than soakers, and are rather fragile (they can often break when being transported, resulting in a wet user, not a wet target). Also, if playing with teams, one team may, for example, get a fort and the other may get access to water balloons.

Festival 
Children, youngsters play Water fights in Maharashtra state of India during annual Rang Panchami festival. It is a Hindu festival. On the festival's day they play with each other with water, using Water gun and try to wet each other. Many use coloured water, some use just water. Rang Panchami festival often called as 'festival of colours' in English language.

Controversy
Water fights in Iran during the summer, when temperatures often reach 40 degrees Celsius, have led to arrests and been attacked by authorities as "corrupt", "shameful", "abnormal" behavior in disobedience of cultural principles.
Water fights have been banned by the police in UK (Battersea Park, 2010) and are banned by parks around London.

See also
Super Soaker
Water gun
Water balloon
Songkran (Thailand)

References

Outdoor games
 
Fight play